Bozi Jan (also Romanized as Bozī Jān; also known as Boz Jūn, Buz-i-Jān, and Buzjūn) is a village in Baqerabad Rural District, in the Central District of Mahallat County, Markazi Province, Iran. At the 2006 census, its population was 620, in 184 families.

References 

Populated places in Mahallat County